Mount Filberg is a mountain on Vancouver Island, British Columbia, Canada, located  east of Gold River and  northeast of Rambler Peak. It is a member of the Vancouver Island Ranges which in turn form part of the Insular Mountains.

See also 
List of mountains in Canada

References 

Vancouver Island Ranges
Two-thousanders of British Columbia
Nootka Land District